Shiann Salmon (born 31 March 1999) is a Jamaican track and field athlete who specializes in the 400 metres hurdles and 400 metres. She represented Jamaica at the 2019 World Athletics Championships, competing in women's 400 metres hurdles. She also competed at the 2018 IAAF World U20 Championships, placing second in the Women's 400 meters hurdles event and third in the Women's 400 meters relay.
She won the 400 m hurdles and the 400 m mixed relay gold medals in the 2021 NACAC U23 Championships.

Personal Bests
Personal Bests (main event in bold):
100m: 12.30s
200m: 25.67s
400m: 51.74s
100m hurdles: 15.75s
400m hurdles: 53.82s
High Jump: 1.82m
Long Jump: 5.50m

References

Jamaican female hurdlers
1999 births
Living people
World Athletics Championships athletes for Jamaica
20th-century Jamaican women
21st-century Jamaican women
Commonwealth Games silver medallists for Jamaica
Commonwealth Games medallists in athletics
Athletes (track and field) at the 2022 Commonwealth Games
Medallists at the 2022 Commonwealth Games